The Captive City (Italian: La città prigioniera) is a 1962 Italian English-language war film directed by Joseph Anthony and starring David Niven, Lea Massari and Ben Gazzara. It is based on the 1955 novel The Captive City by John Appleby. The film was released in the US as Conquered City by American International Pictures as a double feature with The Day the Earth Froze.

Plot
At the end of the Second World War, Athens is liberated by the Allies.  Greek soldiers and partisans, fresh from waging guerilla warfare on the Germans join with local insurgents in an attempt to seize power and the British are finally compelled to vacate the city to encamp around its perimeter.

Meanwhile, a small group of men and women in a hotel find themselves besieged by a rebel army that wants the Nazi armaments in the basement.

Cast
 David Niven as Major Peter Whitfield
 Lea Massari as Lelia Mendores
 Ben Gazzara as Captain George Stubbs
 Michael Craig as Captain Robert Elliott
 Martin Balsam as Joseph Feinberg
 Daniela Rocca as Doushka
 Clelia Matania as Climedes
 Giulio Bosetti as Narriman
 Percy Herbert as Sergent Major Reed
 Ivo Garrani as Mavroti
 Odoardo Spadaro as Janny Mendoris
 Roberto Risso as Loveday
 Venantino Venantini as General Ferolou

References

External links
 
 

1962 films
Italian World War II films
English-language Italian films
American International Pictures films
Films scored by Piero Piccioni
1960s English-language films
1960s Italian films